Yanis Igorevich Linda (born 1 March 1994) is a Russian football player.

Club career
He made his professional debut in the Russian Professional Football League for FC Lokomotiv Liski on 19 May 2014 in a game against FC Dynamo Bryansk.

References

External links

Profile at Crimean Football Union

1994 births
Living people
Russian footballers
Association football midfielders
Russian expatriate footballers
Expatriate footballers in Belarus
Expatriate footballers in Ukraine
Russian expatriate sportspeople in Ukraine
Crimean Premier League players
FC Lokomotiv Moscow players
FC Khimik-Arsenal players
FC Arsenal Tula players
FC Krymteplytsia Molodizhne players
FC Gorodeya players